James Warren (February 24, 1913 – March 28, 2001) was an American film actor and artist.

Early life
Born James Pringle Wittlig in Marietta, Ohio, he was the son of Walter Wittlig, a watchmaker, and Florence Ione Pringle. He had two brothers, the oldest Laurence Pringle Wittlig and a younger brother, David Pringle Wittlig. The Wittligs had emigrated from Langenthal, Switzerland in the 1860s.

However, James did not follow in the family watchmaking tradition. His first love was art, which took him to the Pratt Art Institute of New York where he became a watercolorist and an illustrator for various magazines.

Film career
Warren was sighted by an MGM talent scout, who offered him a contract. Changing his name to James Warren, he, his wife, Felice, and their six-week-old son moved to Hollywood, where over the course of several years he appeared in more than 30 movies. When his MGM contract expired, he moved to RKO.

His first picture at RKO, filmed in the spring of 1945, was Ding Dong Williams, a low-budget musical comedy with a Hollywood theme. He played a slow-witted movie cowboy alongside a palomino horse, Star Dust. RKO had been making Zane Grey westerns with Robert Mitchum in the leading roles, and with Mitchum now advancing to dramatic features, RKO producer Herman Schlom (who had made Ding Dong Williams) remembered how well James Warren photographed in western gear. James Warren (and Star Dust) took over RKO's Zane Grey series, starring in such films as Sunset Pass. His co-stars were Nan Leslie and Jane Greer. The previous Sunset Pass was made in 1933.

Warren's tenure as RKO's cowboy star was brief; the studio's resident star Tim Holt returned from military service and resumed his starring series. Warren returned to character roles. In 1952, he  co-starred with Gloria Swanson in the comedy film Three for Bedroom "C".

During all his time in Hollywood, James had never lost his passion for painting. He produced several one-man shows throughout the US and found a patron in Vincent Price. At one of these shows, Katharine Hepburn purchased seven of Warren's large watercolor paintings which she kept in her private collection.

In 1968 an art commission from Ford Motor Company took him to Hawaii. where he quickly settled into island life and became a highly respected member of the art community.  He maintained an art gallery in Honolulu, as well as Maui. Warren specialized in whimsical interpretations of the Hawaiian Tutus (Grandmothers) and Kikis (Grandchildren) as well as many local images.

He was a well-respected member of the Lahaina Art Society and always was a very willing and gracious participant in all art shows. He continued his one-man shows throughout his later life until his 70s when he chose to remain near his beloved Hawaii.

He died, aged 88, in Kihei, Hawaii leaving four children and several grandchildren.

Filmography

References

External links
 

1913 births
2001 deaths
American male film actors
Male Western (genre) film actors
People from Marietta, Ohio
Metro-Goldwyn-Mayer contract players
RKO Pictures contract players
20th-century American male actors